nanoDSF is a modified differential scanning fluorimetry method to determine protein stability employing intrinsic tryptophan or tyrosine fluorescence.

Protein stability is typically addressed by thermal or chemical unfolding experiments. In thermal unfolding experiments, a linear temperature ramp is applied to unfold proteins, whereas chemical unfolding experiments use chemical denaturants in increasing concentrations.
The thermal stability of a protein is typically described by the 'melting temperature' or 'Tm', at which 50% of the protein population is unfolded, corresponding to the midpoint of the transition from folded to unfolded.

In contrast to conventional DSF methods, nanoDSF uses tryptophan or tyrosine fluorescence to monitor protein unfolding. Both the fluorescence intensity and the fluorescence maximum strongly depends on the close surroundings of the tryptophan. Therefore, the ratio of the fluorescence intensities at 350 nm and 330 nm is suitable to detect any changes in protein structure, for example due to protein unfolding.

Its applications include antibody engineering, membrane protein research, quality control and formulation development. nanoDSF has also been utilized to rapidly evaluate the melting points of enzyme libraries for biotechnological applications.

References

Further reading 

 
 

Biochemistry methods
Protein methods
Biophysics
Molecular biology
Laboratory techniques